Drag Queens of London is a British LGBT-related reality television series, commissioned by London Live network.

The series follows a selection of drag queens over a three-month period in London to get an inside look at their daily lives, both on and off stage. In April 2014, London Live announced a documentary to feature colourful characters from Soho's drag scene as one of the major highlights for this new channel's initial offerings. The series premiered in the United Kingdom on 22 April 2014.

Cast

 Silver Summers (Bobby Houston): Silver is single, fun-loving and a voice to be reckoned with. She is showing no signs of slowing down and enjoys nights of partying hard whilst focussing on performing. She is a member of The Buffalo Girls group, as well as drag troupe The Supreme Fabulettes, and is a successful solo artist. Silver is the only drag queen to be featured in every episode.
 Lady Lloyd (Lloyd Dixon): Lloyd's famously loud personality and brush with fame has earned her celebrity status as a loveable loose cannon within the drag world. She rocketed ahead in the world of drag when Vivienne Westwood chose her as a catwalk model. As well as being a DJ and a host at Soho's club night, "Trannyshack", she is also known for being a third of London's first drag pop band, The Buffalo Girls.
 Baga Chipz (Leo Lauren): Baga believes personality is everything, and idolises and bases her drag act on strong working-class women featured in the 60s and 70s 'golden age' of Coronation Street. She is a member of the Buffalo Girls drag troupe with Lady Lloyd and Silver Summers. (Chipz later competed on the first series of RuPaul's Drag Race UK,  placing third.)
 Miss Dusty O (David Hodge): With over three decades of experience on the drag scene, Dusty O is the voice of reason, and an idol to most young queens. Dusty O is the host and co-promoter of Trannyshack and one of the biggest drag competitions of the year, Trannyshack Academy. She is invited to the prestigious London College of Fashion as a muse to students who make her outfits as part of their course.
 Rosie Beaver (Chris Clegg): Rugby player by day and flamboyant drag queen by night, Rosie breaks all stereotypes by living an unlikely juxtaposition. Always questing for love, Chris finds it hard to tell boys that he's a drag queen. In the series he becomes a mentor to his best friend and fellow rugby player Nick, who decides to explore performing in drag himself.
 Violet Sparks (Nick Burdall): Rosie's best friend and fellow rugby player, and blossoming drag queen. Nick follows in the steps of friend Chris and enters an amateur drag competition. Nick also tries to find love in and out of drag, as well as finding his feet in the drag world. Nick works in an office during the day but uses drag to make his evenings less routine.
 Vanity Von Glow (Thom Glow): After 5 years of success performing as Vanity, Thom is a frustrated queen looking to reignite the excitement she once felt for her act. Out of drag, Thom is now looking to reinvent his act as a boy around LGBT venues, as well as continuing to perform as Vanity on the side.
 Vicki Vivacious (Aaron Johns): A Supreme Fabulette whose theatre aspirations led her to be a part of the top drag troupe, with ideas of a one-woman show and TV stardom, Vicki's got a fame-hungry attitude. Vicki took a six-month break from drag to rejuvenate and reinvent her act. She starred in Priscilla Queen of the Desert in London's prestigious West End theatre.
 Meth (Ben Giddens): Having studied at the prestigious Central School of Speech and Drama, Meth has a professional, alternative show and a sharp wit that has given her a strong cult following. She is the doyenne of Meth Lab, and is now stepping it up another level to bring a string of new club nights to the city. The arrival of DWV to Meth Lab features in the series. He is a member of Familyyy Fierce, a collective of seven drag queens and performers. On April 29, 2020, she announced she was changing her name to Me on Instagram.
 Bourgeoisie: Bourgeoisie is a no-holds-barred Yank with a flair for designing and making ever-more outrageous outfits that ensure she's always being talked about. She is a member of Familyyy Fierce.
 Munroe Bergdorf: Transitioning transsexual and aspiring businesswoman, Munroe is the 'It girl' of the drag scene. Her high-end lifestyle and big dreams ensure she's always in the spotlight.

Recurring cast
 Jodie Harsh: UK drag queen and DJ.
 Walt: Dusty O's co-host and co-promoter of Trannyshack.
 Ruby Wednesday: Baby of the Familyyy Fierce, Ruby Wednesday is ready to prove she's all grown up with her ambitious, androgynous and occasionally alarming act.
 Rubyyy Jones: Familyyy Fierce matriarch, Rubyyy Jones is truly fierce and fabulous, the "UK's Queen of Queerlesque" and also works in theatre as a director and choreographer. 
 Miss Cairo: Familyyy Fierce member, Miss Cairo is famously seductive, but far from being just a pretty face, she is keen to use drag to explore important issues.
 Lilly SnatchDragon: Member of The Familyyy Fierce, stage manager for The Meth Lab.
 Jonny Woo: East London drag performer. Johnny also stars in the Colin Rothbart 'frockumentary' Dressed As A Girl.

Episodes

DVD release

International airings 
The show is currently being broadcast in Australia, Belgium, Canada, the Netherlands, Poland, Finland and Sweden.

References

External links
 

British reality television series
2010s British LGBT-related television series
2014 British television series debuts
Drag (clothing) television shows
2010s LGBT-related reality television series
LGBT culture in London